For the 1969 Tour de France, Eddy Merckx had been removed from the 1969 Giro d'Italia in leading position because of a positive doping result, and was initially not allowed to join, but his suspension was later lifted.
The Tour started with the following 13 teams, each with 10 cyclists:

Start list

By team

By rider

By nationality

References

1969 Tour de France
1969